The Tarka Trail is a series of footpaths and cyclepaths (rail trails) around north Devon, England that follow the route taken by the fictional Tarka the Otter in the book of that name.

The  section between Braunton and Meeth is car-free, level and mostly tarmacked, and is shared by pedestrians and cyclists, with horseriding also permitted on part of it. 

The remainder of the route covers a wide variety of landscapes, including wooded river valleys, moorland, coastal cliffs and sandy beaches.  Walking varies between easy through to moderate and strenuous, depending on the location, but, in general, it is comprehensively waymarked.

The trails are a popular tourist destination and bicycle hire businesses are available for those who wish to cycle along suitable sections of the trail.

History 

The Tarka Trail was established in 1987 as the Taw/Torridge Country Park using the disused railway line between Barnstaple and Bideford. The railway line was purchased for £515,000 in 1986-87 from British Rail. In 1989, the remainder of the line between Bideford and Meeth was acquired in its entirety by Devon County Council for £1. Conversion of this section to a footpath was enabled by a £60,000 Derelict Land Grant from central government in 1989–90, plus a further £100,000 from Devon County Council and the Countryside Commission in 1990–91. A large proportion of the money was needed to adapt and repair bridges across the River Torridge.

Parish councils, Dartmoor and Exmoor National Park Authorities and the National Trust played a part in the development of the rest of the Trail. Their consultation and co-operation ensured low environmental costs while retaining a large degree of accessibility to the Trail. Even the Otter Conservation Officer was involved to ensure there would be no disturbance to otters where the Trail followed water courses.

The section between Barnstaple and Bideford was opened on 21 May 1991 and was made into a combined footpath and cyclepath. The section from Barnstaple to Meeth was named the Tarka Country Park. Once the southern circuit was also incorporated, the Trail spanned . It was opened by Prince Charles in May 1992. The Tarka Country Park identity was finally subsumed by the Tarka Trail in 1994. The route to Meeth was converted into a cycle/walkway in 1997. It was delayed by a quarry covering the line of the old railway.

Disused railways 
Several sections of disused railway line have been used to create the trail.  These have the benefit of being relatively flat, with only small uphill and downhill gradients. The paths also run across many former railway bridges, which command notable views over various rivers and valleys.  A number of railway buildings have been restored on the route, in particular the station buildings at Bideford and Torrington and the signal box at Instow.

Former railway sections include:
 Ilfracombe Branch Line – between Braunton and Barnstaple
 North Devon Railway (Torrington branch) – between Barnstaple, Bideford and Torrington
 North Devon and Cornwall Junction Light Railway - between Torrington and Meeth Halt

Below Braunton, the path follows the western bank of the River Caen, which was straightened to become the Braunton Canal in the 1850s, before following the northern edge of Horsey Island, reclaimed from the estuary at the same time. The path then turns north along the eastern edge of Braunton Burrows, an extensive sand-dune system leased by the Ministry of Defence for army training. The dunes are closed for 10 days per year for this purpose.

Places of interest 
 RMB Chivenor
 Bideford Railway Heritage Centre, which also manages Instow signalbox
 Beam, Great Torrington, birthplace of Tarka the Otter
 Tarka Valley Railway
 Bake and Brew West Yelland

Towns and villages 
The Tarka Trail passes through numerous towns and villages, including:

 Braunton
 Chivenor
 Barnstaple
 Fremington
 Yelland
 Instow
 Bideford
 Torrington
 Petrockstow
 Meeth
 Hatherleigh
 Okehampton
 Lynmouth
 Ilfracombe
 Lee Bay
 Mortehoe
 Woolacombe
 Braunton
 Dolton
 North Tawton

Intersecting paths 
A number of other local walking routes intersect or coincide with the Tarka Trail:
 South West Coast Path – route coincides between Ilfracombe and Bideford
 Two Moors Way – route coincides for part of the way through Exmoor
 Macmillan Way West – route coincides between Barnstaple and Exmoor
 Dartmoor Way  – route coincides 
 West Devon Way
 Two Castles Trail
 Little Dart Ridge and Valley Walk

Public transport 
Using public transport for at least part of their journey means that walkers can plan walks which start and finish at different places, rather than have to circle back to their start point to collect their cars.

Railway 
The Trail may be reached from stations on The Tarka Line, the railway from Exeter to Barnstaple.  Services to some stations are infrequent and at several the trains only stop on request.

Bus services 
Most towns and villages along the Tarka Trail have bus services, although some of these may not be very frequent. The cycle route officially ends at Meeth Halt railway station, though cyclists and walkers can catch a bus that leaves regularly from The Bull and Dragon pub to complete the circular trip.

See also 

 Dartmoor Way
 The South West Coast Path
 Rail trail
 The Camel Trail
 Two Moors Way
 West Devon Way

References 

 Tarka Trail
 North Devon Biosphere

External links 
 Bike Hire
 Tarka Trail Guide
 The Tarka Trail
 Devon Coast-to-Coast Cycle Route
 Ramblers Association – Tarka Trail Walking Info
 British Horse Society 'EMAGIN' online map of Tarka Trail (part) (can be superimposed on OS map)

Footpaths in Devon
Exmoor
Long-distance footpaths in England
Rail trails in England